K. G. Engineering Institute, established in 1922, is a Government polytechnic institute located in the city of Bishnupur, Bankura district, West Bengal, India. It is affiliated to the West Bengal State Council of Technical Education (WBSCTE), approved by All India Council For Technical Education (AICTE), and provides diploma-level technical education to its students. It is controlled by the Department of Technical Education, Training & Skill Development, Government of West Bengal. It is one of the oldest polytechnics in West Bengal and one of the oldest technical institutes in India.

Etymology 
The institute has undergone several name changes since its establishment in 1922. Established as Vishnupur Industrial School in 1922 for the upliftment of cottage industries in Bankura. In 1929 the name was changed to Technical School. The name was again changed in 1940 during the second world war as War Technicians Training Institute. Later in 1951 in honour of its founder Shri Krishna Gopal Ghosh (S.D.O. of Bishnupur, 1922), the institute was renamed as K. G. Engineering Institute.

History 
The institute was initially established as an industrial training school with the introduction of crafts like Weaving, Dyeing, Carpentry. It started functioning as a Technical School in 1929  with four trades that included Welding, Black Smithy, Fitter Training, and Bell metal works. From a small industrial training school, it has grown up to a full-fledged sponsored polytechnic in the year 1949 after independence. The institute was divided into two branches one was a Govt. sponsored polytechnic named after K.G. Ghosh, the founder of Vishnupur Industrial School which had courses on Draftsmanship (2 years course), and Licentiate in Civil Engineering (3 years course). The other was the mother industrial school with courses of Weaving and Carpentry. The Government of West Bengal took it over as a Government Polytechnic in the year 1976. In the year 1981 several diploma courses were introduced Viz. Diploma in Civil, Electrical, Mechanical. Several other departments were created subsequently over the years, the last among them being that of Electronics & Telecommunication Engineering and Computer Science & Technology in 1995.

Campus 
K. G. Engineering Institute is situated at the heart of Bishnupur (the City of Temple), about 150 km from Kolkata and 34 km away from Bankura district town. The campus is located 4 km away from Bihsnupur railway station and about 100 km from Kazi Nazrul Islam Airport. The total area of the institute campus is about 19 acres which accommodate not only the main building for classrooms, workshops, labs, library but also a playground, a 900 seating capacity auditorium, and four hostels out of which one is a well-protected girl’s hostel.

Academics

Departments 

The institute is running with a separate wing for community services under the banner of “Community Development through Polytechnic” which is sponsored and financed by MHRD, Govt. of India. It acts as the main centre with 8 more extension centres in the district.

Admission procedure 
Diploma programs to the various engineering disciplines (3-year Diploma programs) are granted via JEXPO, for lateral entry diploma programs admission is through VOCLET. Both the exams are conducted by the West Bengal State Council of Technical Education and admission is granted as per the merit list.

Training & Placements 
The training cum placement cell is headed by a Training & Placement Officer. Contacts are made to many leading industries and campus interviews are held every year.

Library 
The institute's library occupies 284.025 m2 and houses 20,158 books. The students can issue trade-wise two textbooks for a period of 28 days without a fine. The library has also plenty of seating capacity for reading inside.

Student life and culture

Hostel 
K. G. Engineering Institute provides on-campus residential facilities to its students, faculty members, and many of its staff.

College programs/Fests 

 Fresher’s Welcome Ceremony -  The event is organized to welcome the 1st year students of the college. 
 Foundation Day
 Viswakarma Puja
 Saraswati Puja
 Sports (every 2 years)
 Reunion (every 2 years)

References

External links
 Admission to Polytechnics in West Bengal for Academic Session 2006-2007
http://www.polytechnic.wbtetsd.gov.in/kgeibishnupur

Universities and colleges in Bankura district
Educational institutions established in 1922
1922 establishments in India
Technical universities and colleges in West Bengal